Jorge Andrés Martínez Boero (3 July 1973 – 1 January 2012) was an Argentine motorcycle racer who participated in the 2011 and 2012 Dakar Rally. He died in an accident during the first stage of the 2012 competition.

References 

Novitskiy wins overshadowed Dakar opening stage

1973 births
2012 deaths
Argentine motorcycle racers
Sportspeople from Buenos Aires Province
Dakar Rally drivers
Motorcycle racers who died while racing
Sport deaths in Argentina